Stolidoptera cadioui is a moth of the family Sphingidae. It is known from occidental Ecuador.

It has a wingspan of about 86 mm. It is similar to Stolidoptera tachasara, but can be distinguished on features of wing shape, colour pattern and male genital structure. The upperside of the abdomen is rust-brown with only a narrow median olive-green line. The forewing upperside ground colour is also rust-brown with a pale green apical patch and white scaling along the outer edge of the submarginal line. The forewing underside is brown and the hindwing upperside is dark brown with a broad, pink fringe. The hindwing underside is brown.

References

Dilophonotini
Moths described in 1997